Joonas Viljami Suotamo (born 3 October 1986) is a Finnish actor and former professional basketball player. He is best known for his role as Chewbacca in the Star Wars saga, taking over the role from Peter Mayhew, first as a body double, with Star Wars: The Force Awakens (2015), and later as the lead in Star Wars: The Last Jedi (2017), Solo: A Star Wars Story (2018) and in Star Wars: The Rise of Skywalker (2019).

Early life and education 
Suotamo was born in Espoo. In his youth he performed roles as a stage actor. Suotamo attended Pennsylvania State University (PSU) and played the power forward and centre positions for the Penn State Nittany Lions. With childhood interests in music, arts, and movies he studied film and video at PSU. He was a strong academic performer at Penn State, where he was twice named to the Academic All-Big Ten team, and graduated in  years with a Bachelor of Arts degree in December 2008 in order to fulfill his Finnish conscription service and to pursue a career in film.

He left the army at the rank of second lieutenant (res).

Basketball career

Club career
Suotamo played seven seasons in Finland's basketball leagues, including four seasons in the top-tier Korisliiga. He has also had a career selling insurance.

National team career
Suotamo played three games for the Finnish national basketball team and 66 games for the junior national teams.

Acting career 
Suotamo is mostly known for his role as Chewbacca in the Star Wars franchise, a role in which he started out being a body double for the original actor Peter Mayhew in Star Wars: The Force Awakens (2015), as Mayhew's age and worsening health was making it more difficult for him to fill the role. He went on to entirely replace Mayhew in Star Wars: The Last Jedi (2017) as Chewbacca, with Mayhew as a consultant. He returned to the role in Solo: A Star Wars Story (2018) and Star Wars: The Rise of Skywalker (2019).

Filmography

Film

Television

References

External links

 
 
 Penn State basketball profile
 Joonas Suotamo at sports-reference.com
 Finnish leagues statistics at basket.fi

Living people
21st-century Finnish male actors
Centers (basketball)
Espoon Honka players
Finnish expatriate basketball people in the United States
Finnish men's basketball players
Penn State Nittany Lions basketball players
Penn State College of Arts and Architecture alumni
People from Espoo
Power forwards (basketball)
1986 births